Farq Sar-e Pain (also Romanized as Farq Sar-e Pā’īn; also known as Farq Sar and Farkhasar) is a village in Maraveh Tappeh Rural District, in the Central District of Maraveh Tappeh County, Golestan Province, Iran. At the 2006 census, its population was 796, in 129 families.

References 

Populated places in Maraveh Tappeh County